Koodi is the debut album by Finnish teen pop singer Robin, released on 22 February 2012 through Universal Music Finland.

Track list
 "Frontside Ollie"
 "Räjäytät mun pään"
 "Hiljainen tyttö"
 "Faija skitsoo"
 "Otan aurinkoo"
 "Ei tarvii esittää"
 "Huutaa"
 "Huominen saa odottaa"
 "Saappaat"
 "Ihan helmi"

References

See also
List of best-selling albums in Finland

2012 debut albums
Robin (singer) albums